Marie of Brabant may refer to:

 Marie of Brabant, Holy Roman Empress (1190–1260), wife of Emperor Otto IV of the Holy Roman Empire
Marie of Brabant, Duchess of Bavaria (1226–1256), wife of Louis II, Duke of Bavaria
Marie of Brabant, Queen of France (1254–1321), wife of Philip III of France
Marie of Brabant, Countess of Savoy (1278–1338), wife of Amadeus V, Count of Savoy